Las  is a village in the administrative district of Gmina Toszek, within Gliwice County, Silesian Voivodeship, in southern Poland.

The name Las means "forest" in Polish.

References

Las